The Hawthorne School was a historic, Tudor Revival school building in Canonsburg, Pennsylvania. It was listed on the National Register of Historic Places on May 8, 1986.

It is designated as a historic public landmark by the Washington County History & Landmarks Foundation.

History 
In the 1920s, the borough of Canonsburg made the switch from "centralized schools", where the school was located in the center of a community, to "ward schools", where the schools spread across the community. Canonsburg hired George Brugger to design three new schools.

As opposed to the two other schools that utilitarian in design, residents had requested that the third school be more "traditional".  Brugger designed the Hawthorne with Tudor Revival style.

The Hawthorne School was demolished in September 1986, after it was purchased by nearby residents to prevent it from being developed into an apartment building.

See also 
 National Register of Historic Places listings in Washington County, Pennsylvania

Notes

References 

 

School buildings on the National Register of Historic Places in Pennsylvania
School buildings completed in 1927
Defunct schools in Pennsylvania
Demolished buildings and structures in Pennsylvania
Buildings and structures in Washington County, Pennsylvania
1927 establishments in Pennsylvania
National Register of Historic Places in Washington County, Pennsylvania
Buildings and structures demolished in 1986